Samuel A. Kirkpatrick was president of the University of Texas at San Antonio (UTSA) and Eastern Michigan University (EMU).

Early life
Kirkpatrick earned a bachelor's degree in education from Shippensburg University and a masters and Ph.D. in political science from Pennsylvania State University. From 1970 until 1990, Kirkpatrick was a faculty member at various universities, eventually serving as head of the Political Science Department at Texas A&M University, and then Dean of the College of Liberal Arts and Sciences at Arizona State University.

President of the University of Texas at San Antonio
Kirkpatrick served as the fourth president of UTSA, from 1990 through 1999. Under his leadership, UTSA underwent a major expansion in enrollment, faculty, building projects, and degree programs.

President of Eastern Michigan University
In 2001, Kirkpatrick was hired as the president of Eastern Michigan University. He immediately pushed for the construction of a new president's house, arguing that a larger space was needed to host fundraisers and other official events. Kirkpatrick resigned from EMU in 2004, under pressure after a state investigation into the $6 million construction cost of University House, the new residence he had sought.

References

Presidents of Eastern Michigan University
University of Texas at San Antonio faculty
Shippensburg University of Pennsylvania alumni
Pennsylvania State University alumni
Arizona State University faculty